Bahman District is in Abarkuh County, Yazd province, Iran. At the 2006 National Census, its population was 13,001 in 3,422 households. The following census in 2011 counted 13,429 people in 3,839 households. At the latest census in 2016, the district had 14,196 inhabitants in 4,271 households.

References 

Abarkuh County

Districts of Yazd Province

Populated places in Yazd Province

Populated places in Abarkuh County